Lenah is an unincorporated community located in the Aldie ZIP code area on U.S. Route 50 in Loudoun County, Virginia. It lies at the crossroads of U.S. Route 50 and Lenah Road.

Unincorporated communities in Loudoun County, Virginia
Washington metropolitan area
Unincorporated communities in Virginia